DYMG (103.1 FM), broadcasting as 103.1 Brigada News FM, is a radio station owned and operated by Brigada Mass Media Corporation. The station's studio and transmitter are located at Capitol Shopping Center, Benigno S. Aquino Dr., Brgy. Villamonte, Bacolod. DYMG is the pioneer FM station in Bacolod.

History
It was inaugurated in 1978 under the ownership of Westwind Broadcasting Corporation as Magik 103 with a Top 40 format. In 1999, the station rebranded as Y103. In 2005, the Armed Forces of the Philippines acquired the station and rebranded it as Radyo Kumando with a music & news format. In May 2018, Brigada Mass Media acquired the station and rebranded it as Brigada News FM.

References

Radio stations in Bacolod
Radio stations established in 1978